Thomas Jefferson Jarrell (March 1, 1901 – January 28, 1985) was an American fiddler, banjo player, and singer from the Mount Airy region of North Carolina's Appalachian Mountains.

Biography
He was born in Surry County, North Carolina, United States. Although he made his living from road construction (operating a motor grader for the North Carolina Highway Department until his retirement in 1966), Jarrell was an influential musician, eventually attracting attention from Washington D.C. when he received the National Endowment for the Arts' National Heritage Fellowship in 1982. That year's fellowships were the first bestowed by the NEA, and are considered the United States government's highest honor in the folk and traditional arts.

Jarrell's style was notable for its expressive use of syncopation and sliding ornamentation, and he was adept at singing while playing. His formidable technique and rough timbre continue to influence modern aficionados of Appalachian old-time music and in particular the Round Peak style of clawhammer banjo.

In his later years, Jarrell lived in the small unincorporated community of Toast, North Carolina. His life is documented in two films by Les Blank, listed below.

Tommy Jarrell died in January 1985 from a heart attack in his home, at the age of 83.

Legacy
Jarrell's first fiddle, which he bought for $10, is now in the collection of the Smithsonian Institution.

He was the subject of two documentaries produced by Les Blank: Sprout Wings and Fly and My Old Fiddle: A Visit with Tommy Jarrell in the Blue Ridge. He also featured in the 2002 DVD Legends of Old Time Music.

An annual festival, established in 2002 as the Tommy Jarrell Celebration, is held in Mount Airy, North Carolina.

Selected discography
1976 - Sail Away Ladies.  Tommy Jarrell.  County Records
1986 - Been Riding with Old Mosby.  Frank Bode with Tommy Jarrell and Paul Brown. Folkways Records

References

External links
 Jarrell commemorated in the Old Time Fiddler's Hall of Fame.  Includes sound file.
Donny Mussel's Tommy Jarrell page
 Field Recorders Collective "To find a superb collection of CDs of American traditional styles; including Tommy Jarrell and Fred Cockerham, music from private collections now made available to the public"
Been Riding with Old Mosby album details at Smithsonian Folkways
Appalachian Journey: PBS film with a segment on Jarrell
Tribute by David Holt to Jarrell as a mentor

1901 births
1985 deaths
People from Surry County, North Carolina
American fiddlers
American banjoists
National Heritage Fellowship winners
Appalachian old-time fiddlers
Old-time musicians
20th-century American violinists